Wheatgrass is the freshly sprouted first leaves of the common wheat plant, grown for human consumption.

Wheatgrass may also refer to:
 Agropyron, a genus known as crested-wheat grasses
 Elymus (plant), a genus of wild rye, sometimes called wheatgrass
 Eremopyrum, a genus in the sub-family Pooideae, known as false wheatgrass
 Pascopyrum, a genus known as wheatgrass
 Pseudelymus, a genus called foxtail wheatgrass
 Pseudoroegneria, a genus in the sub-family Pooideae, known as wheatgrass
 Thinopyrum, a genus in the sub-family Pooideae, known as wheatgrass
 Wild Triga (Thinopyrum intermedium), intermediate wheatgrass for human consumption
 Thinopyrum ponticum,	tall wheatgrass

See also
 Common wheat, Triticum aestivum
 Wheat (disambiguation)
 Pooideae, a subfamily of grasses